Kaki Bukit Constituency was a single member constituency (SMC) in Bedok, Singapore; carved from Kampong Chai Chee division in prior to 1980 elections and was absorbed into the Eunos GRC on 1988 elections.

In 1984, Tan Chee Kien was offered the non-constituency Member of Parliament (NCMP) seat  after Madai Puthan Damodaran Nair, a Workers' Party candidate in Jalan Kayu Constituency had declined the offered NCMP seat. Tan declined the seat as well.

Member of Parliament

Elections

Elections in 1980s

References

1984 GE's result
1980 GE's result

Bedok